Douglas Arnoldo Rico González (born 28 September 1969) is a Venezuelan policeman, current director of the Corps of Scientific, Criminal and Criminal Investigations (CICPC).

Career 
In May 2013, President Nicolás Maduro announced the appointment of José Gregorio Sierralta and Douglas Rico as director and deputy director, respectively, of the Corps of Scientific, Criminal and Criminal Investigations (CICPC), and on 5 February 2016 Maduro announced the appointment de Rico as director of the CICPC. In 2018, Rico was ratified as director of the organization. 

In 2016, Rico published the book called "For your safety" (Spanish: Por tu seguridad). The commissioner indicated that the issue was intended to promote crime prevention.

In 2019, the National Assembly summoned Rico after police officers withdrew from a confrontation with criminal gangs. During his tenure, Rico intervened the Anti-Extortion and Kidnapping Division of the CICPC in Caracas for "alleged police malpractice" and later announced its separation.

References 

1969 births
Venezuelan police officers
Living people